Sun Bronzed Greek Gods is the debut EP by American indie pop band Dom, released in 2010 on Burning Mill Records. 

On April 5, 2010, the album was re-released.  On February 11, 2011, it was re-released again with a new cover, remastered audio and an iTunes bonus track, "Beth." The track "Living In America" was featured in the video game Grand Theft Auto V on an in-game radio station.

Track listing

References

External links 
 Official "Living In America" music video

2010 EPs
Dom (band) albums